Excel Global School (EGS) is an International School affiliated to Cambridge International Examinations. It is one among the Excel Group of Schools located within the Excel Complex, Awai Farm Lane, Thiruvattar, India. It came into existence on 10 June 2009.

See also

 Excel Central School

References

External links
 EGS Home Page 
  Cambridge International Examinations - Excel Global School

International schools in India
Cambridge schools in India
High schools and secondary schools in Tamil Nadu
Schools in Kanyakumari district
Thiruvattar
Educational institutions established in 2009
2009 establishments in Tamil Nadu